This is a list of the tallest buildings in Maine over 100 ft from ground level.

Tallest Buildings

Footnotes

References
 Emporis.com

Maine
Tallest